This list is of the Historic Sites of Japan located within the Prefecture of Miyagi.

National Historic Sites
As of 1 December 2020, thirty-seven Sites have been designated as being of national significance (including one *Special Historic Site); the Dewa Sendai Kaidō Nakayamagoe Pass spans the prefectural borders with Yamagata.

| align="center"|Akai Kanga RuinsAkai kanga iseki-gun || Higashimatsushima || designation includes the  || ||  || 2 || 
|-
|}

Prefectural Historic Sites
As of 20 May 2020, fifteen Sites have been designated as being of prefectural importance.

Municipal Historic Sites
As of 1 May 2020, a further two hundred and fifty Sites have been designated as being of municipal importance.

See also

 Cultural Properties of Japan
 Tōhoku History Museum
 List of Places of Scenic Beauty of Japan (Miyagi)
 List of Cultural Properties of Japan - paintings (Miyagi)

References

External links
  Historic Sites of Miyagi Prefecture

Miyagi Prefecture
 Miyagi